Coulsdon Town may refer to:

Coulsdon, a suburb of London, United Kingdom
Coulsdon Town (ward), an electoral ward for the Croydon Council
Coulsdon Town railway station, serving the above
Coulsdon Town F.C., a football club in Coulsdon